Licania chiriquiensis is a species of plant in the family Chrysobalanaceae. It is endemic to Panama.  It is threatened by habitat loss.

References

Endemic flora of Panama
chiriquiensis
Critically endangered plants
Taxonomy articles created by Polbot
Taxobox binomials not recognized by IUCN